Erythrolamprus festae, also known commonly as the drab ground snake, is a species of snake in the family Colubridae. The species is native to northwestern South America.

Etymology
The specific name, festae, is in honor of Italian zoologist Enrico Festa.

Geographic range
E. festae is found in  Ecuador and Peru.

Habitat

Reproduction
E. festae is oviparous.

References

Further reading
Amaral A (1929). "Estudos sobre ophidios neotropicos XVIII. Lista remissiva dos ophidios da região neotropica ". Memórias do Instituto Butantan 4: 126–271. (Liophis festae, new combination, p. 171). (in Portuguese).
Grazziotin FG, Zaher H, Murphy RW, Scrocchi G, Benavides MA, Zhang Y-P, Bonatto SL (2012). "Molecular phylogeny of the New World Dipsadidae (Serpentes: Colubroidea): a reappraisal". Cladistics 28 (5): 437–459. (Erythrolamprus festae, new combination).
Peracca MG (1897). "Viaggio del Dr. Enrico Festa nell'Ecuador e regioni vicine. IV. ". Bollettino dei Musei di Zoologia ed Anatomia comparata della R[egia]. Università di Torino 12 (300): 1–20. (Rhadinaea festae, new species, pp. 16–17). (in Italian).
Torres-Carvajal O, Hinojosa KC (2020). "Hidden diversity in two widespread snake species (Serpentes: Xenodontini: Erythrolamprus) from South America". Molecular Phylogenetics and Evolution 146: 106772. (Erythrolamprus festae).

Erythrolamprus
Reptiles of Ecuador
Reptiles of Peru
Reptiles described in 1897
Taxa named by Mario Giacinto Peracca